Knut Gunnarsson Helland (November 6, 1880–June 27, 1919) was a Norwegian American Hardanger fiddle maker.

Biography
Knut Gunnarson Helland was from Bø, Norway. Helland worked in the traditional region of Telemark in the workshop of his father, Gunnar Olavsson Helland, until he emigrated to United States in 1901. In 1905, he started Helland Brothers workshop in Chippewa Falls, Wisconsin, with his brother Gunnar Gunnarsson Helland. Knut Helland died in 1919, three weeks after surgery for appendicitis. His brother, Gunnar continued the workshop alone until it was closed down in 1927.

Hardanger fiddle

See also 
 The Helland fiddle maker family

References

Related Reading
Aksdal, Bjørn (2009) Hardingfela felemakere og instrumentets utvikling (Trondheim: Tapir Akademisk Forlag)

External links 
The Helland fiddle maker family
National Music Museum - Hardingfele

1880 births
1920 deaths
People from Bø, Telemark
Norwegian emigrants to the United States
Norwegian musical instrument makers
Fiddle makers